is a railway station in the city of Ashikaga, Tochigi, Japan, operated by the private railway operator Tōbu Railway.

Lines

Station layout
The station consists of an elevated island platform serving two tracks.

Platforms

Adjacent stations

History
It was renamed  on August 25, 1924. The station was rebuilt as an elevated station on July 23, 1980.

From 17 March 2012, station numbering was introduced on all Tōbu lines, with Ashikagashi Station becoming "TI-15".

Passenger statistics
In fiscal 2019, the station was used by an average of 6010 passengers daily (boarding passengers only).

Bus services
South Entrance
There are direct express bus services for Narita Airport, Haneda Airport, Osaka, Kyoto, Nara, Nara, Nagoya, Kanazawa, Toyama, and Sendai.

Surrounding area
Ashikaga City Hall
Ashikaga Post Office
Ashikaga Red Cross Hospital
Ashikaga Gakko
 
JR East Ashikaga Station (1 km northeast of the station)
Orihime Jinja
Banna-ji

References

External links

Ashikagashi Station  

Tobu Isesaki Line
Stations of Tobu Railway
Railway stations in Tochigi Prefecture
Railway stations in Japan opened in 1907
Ashikaga, Tochigi